Daniel Rosenbichler (born 10 July 1995) is an Austrian professional footballer who plays as a right-back for SKU Amstetten.

Career
On 20 June 2019, Rosenbichler joined SV Lafnitz on a 1-year contract.

Rosenbichler joined SKU Amstetten on 1 June 2022.

References

External links
 
 

Austrian footballers
Association football defenders
FC Wacker Innsbruck (2002) players
Kapfenberger SV players
SV Lafnitz players
SKU Amstetten players
2. Liga (Austria) players
Austrian Regionalliga players
1995 births
Living people